Yonatan Revivo (born 15 February 1988) is an Israeli professional football (soccer) player currently with Liga Bet club Beitar Ashdod.

References

1988 births
Living people
Israeli Jews
Israeli footballers
Bnei Yehuda Tel Aviv F.C. players
Sektzia Ness Ziona F.C. players
Maccabi Kiryat Malakhi F.C. players
Maccabi Ironi Bat Yam F.C. players
Maccabi Sha'arayim F.C. players
Beitar Kfar Saba F.C. players
Maccabi Kiryat Gat F.C. players
Maccabi Ironi Amishav Petah Tikva F.C. players
Hapoel Ashkelon F.C. players
Maccabi Yavne F.C. players
F.C. Kafr Qasim players
F.C. Dimona players
Hapoel Ashdod F.C. players
Maccabi Ironi Netivot F.C. players
Israeli people of Moroccan-Jewish descent
Israeli Premier League players
Liga Leumit players
Footballers from Ashdod
Association football midfielders